Argent is a surname of unclear origin. It may be from the Old French word for silver, a nickname surname for a metalworker or a person with grey hair, or a topographical surname for someone living near a silver mine. Several French towns are called 'Argent', towns which are near silver mines.

Notables with this name include 
Douglas Argent
Edward Argent
James Argent
Maurice Argent
Argent (Middlesex cricketer)
Rodney Argent
Allison Argent (Teen Wolf)

References